The Zhicheng Yangtze River Bridge  is a road-rail truss bridge across the Yangtze River at Zhicheng, Hubei Province in central China. The bridge, built from 1965 to 1971, was the third road-rail crossing on the lower 2,884 km (1,792 mi) of the Yangtze below Yibin.

History
Planning for the Zhicheng Yangtze River bridge began in 1958.  Construction began on November 26, 1965.  The original plans called for only a rail bridge, but in the spring of 1970, Premier Zhou Enlai approved a proposal to add roadway lanes to either side of the rail tracks.  The bridge opened on December 26, 1971, Mao Zedong's birthday.  At the time, the bridge was the third road-rail bridge across the Yangtze below Yibin, after the Wuhan Yangtze River Bridge and Nanjing Yangtze River Bridge and the fourth overall, after the Baishatuo Yangtze River Railway Bridge in Chongqing.

For 15 months from 2012 to 2014, the bridge was closed for repairs.

See also
Yangtze River bridges and tunnels

References

1971 establishments in China
Bridges completed in 1971
Bridges in Hubei
Bridges over the Yangtze River
Truss bridges in China
Railway bridges in China
Road bridges in China
Road-rail bridges in China